The Tha Din Daeng campaign (literally 'Tha Din Daeng War') was a short conflict, occurring in 1786 in Tha Din Daeng, now in Kanchanaburi Province in western Thailand. The belligerents were King Bodawpaya of the Burmese Konbaung Dynasty, against Phraphutthayotfa Chulalok and Maha Sura Singhanat of the Rattanakosin Kingdom.

Military Campaigns

Prelude
After many defeats in early 1786, King Bodawpaya retreated to Martaban. However, he retained some of his forces on the Tenasserim Coast waiting for the new campaigns. The traditional wars were usually conducted in dry season as the lands in the rainy season were swampy and ravaged with disease, making it unsuitable for marching and encampment. King Bodawpaya ordered the Burmese forces at Tavoy to retreat to Martaban under the command of Minhla Sithu, while Maha Thiri Thihathu was ordered to retreat from Mergui to Tavoy. The king then marched back to Dagon where he worshipped the famous Shwedagon Pagoda and returned to Ava. The Burmese armies stationed at Martaban and Tavoy, waiting for the rainy season to be over to conduct new invasions of Siam.

In September 1786, King Bodawpaya resumed his Siamese campaigns. He sent his eldest son and heir, Prince Thado Minsaw or Prince Nanda Kyawdin (known in Thai sources as Einshe Maha Uparaja) to Martaban to organize the new invasion of Siam.

Preparations

Prince Nanda Kyawdin or Einshe Uparaja took the lead of the army of 50,000 men at Martaban, with Wundauk Nemyo Kyawzwa as his Sitke. King Bodawpaya made sure that the provision shortage would not hinder the campaign again. He ordered the grain rations of Arakan and the whole Lower Burma to be sent to the frontlines. The Burmese also established strong supply lines with supply outposts stationed all along the way from Martaban to Kanchanaburi. Unlike the previous invasion, the Burmese concentrate the forces in single direction at Kanchanaburi instead of dispersing the forces in many directions. Prince Nanda Kyawdin sent Minhla Sithu, the Burmese veteran who had been defeated by the Siamese at the Battle of Latya seven months earlier, to lead the vanguard of 30,000 ahead into Kanchanaburi.

Emboldened by their successes earlier in the year, the Siamese were much more confident in their responses to the Burmese invasion. Both King Rama I and his brother Prince Maha Sura Singhanat marched to meet the Burmese at Kanchanaburi.
Prince Maha Sura Singhanat, along with his two generals Phraya Kalahom Ratchasena and Phraya Chasaenyakorn and Chao Phraya Rattanapipit the Samuha Nayok, marched ahead the army of 30,000 men.
King Rama I himself and his nephew Prince Anurak Devesh of the Rear Palace led the royal army of 30,000 men.

The Battle (March 1787) 
The Burmese armies entered Kanchanaburi through the Three Pagodas Pass or Payathonzu. Minha Sithu divided his forces to station at Tha Din Daeng and Samsop, both in Sangkhlaburi, Kanchanaburi. Prince Nanda Kyawdin stayed at the Three Padogas. Prince Maha Sura Singhanat marched to Sai Yok in Kanchanaburi and encamped. He ordered his generals Phraya Kalahom Ratchasena and Phraya Chasaenyakorn to march ahead as vanguard to Sangkhlaburi. When King Rama I had reached Sai Yok, Prince Maha Sura Singhanat moved to Sangkhlaburi. The Siamese armies concealed their movements in the jungles to inflict the surprise attack on the Burmese.

After long marches, the two sides finally met at Tha Din Daeng and Samsop in March 1787. The fighting was very short and Minhla Sithu was quickly defeated, again for the second time. This short war was called “Tha Din Daeng campaign”. Minhla Sithu retreated back to Payathonzu. Prince Nanda Kyawdin, upon seeing the defeat of Minhla Sithu, also retreated back to Martaban. The Siamese forces burnt all the Burmese grain supplies in Kanchanaburi

The campaign is commemorated by a park established by the Royal Thai Army  from the town of Kanchanaburi.

See also
 Burmese–Siamese War (1785–86)
 Burmese–Siamese wars
 Burma–Thailand relations

References

Conflicts in 1786
Battles of the Burmese–Siamese wars
Wars involving the Rattanakosin Kingdom
1780s in Siam